Reda Rhalimi is a Moroccan basketball player.

Biography
He was (born February 2, 1982 in Salé, Morocco) and plays (center) currently playing for Kyoto Hannaryz in the Japanese bj league. He also played for PAOK Thessaloniki, Cholet Basket and Makedonikos B.C.

Rhalimi is a member of the Morocco national basketball team. He participated in both the 2007 and 2009 FIBA Africa Championship.

References

1982 births
Living people
Kyoto Hannaryz players
Makedonikos B.C. players
Moroccan men's basketball players
Cholet Basket players
P.A.O.K. BC players
Philippine Basketball Association imports
Magnolia Hotshots players
Centers (basketball)
Moroccan expatriate basketball people in the Philippines